Carl Lindbergh Bernard Rogers, commonly known as C. L. B. Rogers, (1928 – 25 July 1996) was a Hounduran-born Belizean politician.

Electoral history

Rogers was a founding member of the National Independence Party in 1958, winning a seat on the Belize City Council under its banner in December of that year.

A member of the People's United Party after 1961, Rogers was first elected to the British Honduras Legislative Assembly (now the Belize House of Representatives) in 1961 from Belize City-based Mesopotamia constituency. A close political ally of PUP leader and Premier George Cadle Price, Rogers served as Minister of Home Affairs and Deputy Premier. He was defeated for re-election in 1979 by the United Democratic Party's Curl Thompson.

After leaving office Rogers served as the Belizean ambassador to the United Nations.

References

1928 births
1996 deaths
People from Atlántida Department
People's United Party politicians
Government ministers of Belize
Members of the Belize House of Representatives for Mesopotamia